2018 Emperor's Cup Final was the 98th final of the Emperor's Cup competition. The final was played at Saitama Stadium 2002 in Saitama on December 9, 2018. Urawa Reds won the championship.

Match details

See also
2018 Emperor's Cup

References

Emperor's Cup
2018 in Japanese football
Urawa Red Diamonds matches
Vegalta Sendai matches